Vasilios Skarlatos (born 2 February 1984) is a Greek footballer .

Skarlatos played youth football for Akratitos F.C., and signed a professional contract with the club in January 2003. He made 11 appearances for the club in the Alpha Ethniki during the 2002–03 and 2003–04 seasons.

References

1984 births
Living people
Greek footballers
A.P.O. Akratitos Ano Liosia players
Vyzas F.C. players
Kavala F.C. players
Olympiacos Volos F.C. players
Kalamata F.C. players
Association football forwards